Erw y Ddafad-ddu is a subsidiary summit of Aran Fawddwy in southern Snowdonia, North Wales, Wales, United Kingdom. It is the third highest peak in the Aran mountain range.

It is lies at the centre of the main Aran ridge, situated between Aran Fawddwy to the south and Aran Benllyn to the north. Its east ridge leads off to the summit of Foel Hafod-fynydd. The summit is rocky and is marked by a small cairn.

References

External links
www.geograph.co.uk : photos of Aran Fawddwy and surrounding area

Llanuwchllyn
Mountains and hills of Gwynedd
Mountains and hills of Snowdonia
Hewitts of Wales
Nuttalls